Kunice is a municipality and village in Prague-East District in the Central Bohemian Region of the Czech Republic. It has about 1,700 inhabitants.

Administrative parts
Villages of Dolní Lomnice, Horní Lomnice, Vidovice and Všešímy are administrative parts of Kunice.

Geography
It lies in the Benešov Uplands.

History
The first written mention of Kunice is from 970, when the local church was founded.

Transport
The D1 motorway passes through the municipality.

Sport
Football club FK Kunice represents the municipality.

Sights
The landmark of Kunice is the Church of Saint Mary Magdalene. It was built in the Gothic style in the 14th century and rebuilt in the Baroque style in the 17th and 18th centuries.

Berchtold Castle is located in Vidovice. It was built in 1877. Today it serves as a hotel. The ground floor of the castle is open to the public and houses the municipal museum.

References

External links

Villages in Prague-East District